The 1912 Illinois lieutenant gubernatorial election was held on November 5, 1912. Incumbent first-term Republican lieutenant governor John G. Oglesby was defeated by Democratic nominee Barratt O'Hara.

Primary elections
Primary elections were held on April 9, 1912.

Democratic primary

Candidates

Frank D. Comerford, former State Senator
Charles C. Craig, former State Representative
Adlai T. Ewing, President of the Iroquois Club of Chicago
William E. Golden
Barratt O'Hara, editor of the Chicago Magazine and Sunday Telegram
J. L. Pickering, Sr.
Gustavus T. Tatge, former Cook County State's attorney

Results

Republican primary

Candidates
John G. Oglesby, incumbent Lieutenant Governor
Kinnie A. Ostewig
Reuben R. Tiffany

Results

Prohibition primary

Candidates
Jacob H. Hoofstitler

Results

Socialist primary

Candidates
F. T. Maxwell

Results

General election

Candidates
Dean Franklin, Progressives for S.J., Macomb municipal judge
Jacob H. Hoofstitler, Prohibition
F. T. Maxwell, Socialist
Barratt O'Hara, Democratic
John G. Oglesby, Republican
Gottlieb Renner, Socialist Labor

Results

See also
1912 Illinois gubernatorial election

References

Bibliography

1912
lieutenant ubernatorial
Illinois
November 1912 events in the United States